The 2009–10 Miami Hurricanes women's basketball team represented the University of Miami in the 2009–2010 NCAA Division I basketball season. The team was coached by Katie Meier. The Hurricanes are a member of the Atlantic Coast Conference and attempted to win an NCAA championship.

Offseason
April 16: Head coach Katie Meier has announced that Shanel Williams has signed a National Letter of Intent to play for the Hurricanes beginning in the 2009-10 season. Williams is a native of Chesapeake, Virginia and led her Indian River High School team to an 89-20 record in her four-year career. The guard averaged 14.8 points per game her senior season.
April 20: For the second consecutive season, an incoming University of Miami women's basketball player has been named to PARADE Magazine's Third-Team All-American squad. Morgan Stroman from Hopkins, South Carolina joined has joined the Hurricanes. Stroman is  a 6-2 forward from Lower Richmond High School and has recently been named to the Sporting News Prep All-American Second-Team and earlier this month played in the 2009 McDonald's All-American game at the BankUnited Center. She ranks No. 8 nationally by the Blue Star report and No. 33 by HoopGurlz.com.
April 27: The women's basketball team, along with the women's soccer and volleyball teams, paired up to contribute to the community on April 25 by participating in the Habitat for Humanity Project in the Liberty City section of northwest Miami. The players helped to build a home for a deserving family, a project that has stretched for two weeks.
May 17: University of Miami women's basketball player, Shenise Johnson was one of 14 players that were named finalists for the USA Under-19 World Championship team. Johnson is the first Hurricane in program history that has been named a finalist for any USA Women's Basketball Team.

Regular season
The Hurricanes will compete in the UM Thanksgiving Tournament from November 27–28. From December 28–29, Miami will host the UM Holiday Tournament.

Roster

Schedule

Atlantic Coast Tournament

Player stats

Postseason

NCAA basketball tournament

Awards and honors

Team players drafted into the WNBA

See also
2009–10 ACC women’s basketball season
List of Atlantic Coast Conference women's basketball regular season champions
List of Atlantic Coast Conference women's basketball tournament champions

References

External links
Official Site

Miami Hurricanes women's basketball seasons
Miami Hurricanes